Mainero is a surname. Notable people with the surname include:

Giovanni Battista Mainero ( 1600–1657), Italian painter 
Guido Mainero (born 1995), Argentine footballer

See also
Mainero, Tamaulipas
Maneiro